3970X may refer to:
AMD Ryzen Threadripper 3970X, computer processor released in 2019
Intel Core i7-3970X, computer processor released in 2012